Human capital is the personal skills and knowledge of value to an organization or society.

Human Capital may also refer to:
 Human Capital (2013 film), an Italian drama directed by Paolo Virzì
 Human Capital (2019 film), an American-Italian drama directed by Marc Meyers
 Human Capital (magazine), a Singaporean human resources publication
 Human Capital Index, a report by the World Bank
 Human Capital Institute, an American management institute